Pomain is a town in the Fara Department of Balé Province in southern Burkina Faso. The town has a total population of 1,469  .

References

Populated places in the Boucle du Mouhoun Region